Thomas Henry Sutton Sotheron-Estcourt PC DL JP (4 April 1801 – 6 January 1876), known as Thomas Bucknall-Estcourt until 1839 and as Thomas Sotheron from 1839 to 1855, was a British Conservative politician.

Background and education
Sotheron-Estcourt was the eldest son of Thomas Grimston Estcourt, Member of Parliament (MP) for Devizes and Oxford University, son of Thomas Estcourt, Member of Parliament for Cricklade. His mother was Eleanor, daughter of James Sutton. He was educated at Harrow and Oriel College, Oxford.

Political career
Estcourt was elected to Parliament as MP for Marlborough in 1829. He was elected to parliament again in 1835 as MP for Devizes, switched to North Wiltshire in 1844, and continued in the Commons until 1865. Sotheron resumed the name Estcourt in 1855, and entered Lord Derby's second government in 1858 as President of the Poor Law Board. The next year, he became Home Secretary, but the government soon fell. He had been sworn of the Privy Council in 1858.

Family
Sotheron-Estcourt married Lucy Sarah, daughter of Admiral Frank Sotheron, in 1830. In 1839 he assumed by Royal licence the surname of Sotheron in lieu of his patronymic in order to inherit his father-in-law's property. However, in 1853 he resumed by Royal licence the surname of Estcourt in addition to that of Sotheron. He retired from public life in 1863 after a paralytic seizure. He died in January 1876, aged 74. His wife had died in 1870. Sotheron-Estcourt's estates passed to his nephew George Bucknall-Estcourt, who assumed the surname of Sotheron-Estcourt and was created Baron Estcourt in 1903.

References

External links 
 

1801 births
1876 deaths
Conservative Party (UK) MPs for English constituencies
Alumni of Oriel College, Oxford
Members of the Privy Council of the United Kingdom
People educated at Harrow School
UK MPs 1835–1837
UK MPs 1837–1841
UK MPs 1841–1847
UK MPs 1847–1852
UK MPs 1852–1857
UK MPs 1857–1859
UK MPs 1859–1865